Rollo is a given name and surname derived from a Latinized form of the Old Norse Hrólfr or Rolfr (Rolf, Rudolf) meaning "famed wolf". 

The name was first attested to with Viking warlord Rollo of Normandy, ancestor of William the Conqueror. In Scotland the Clan Rollo were supporters of Charles II and rewarded with the title of Lord Rollo.

Notable people with the name include:

Given name
 Rollo of Normandy (fl. 10th century), Viking leader and first count of Normandy
 Rollo Armstrong (born 1966), English dancer and music producer
 Rollo Beck (1870–1950), American ornithologist
 Rollo Walter Brown (1880-1956), American writer and teacher of rhetoric
 Rollo Graham Campbell (1903–1978), Anglican Bishop of Colombo
 Rollo Carpenter (born 1965), British computer scientist
 Rollo Davidson (1944–1970), British mathematician
 Rollo Feilding, 11th Earl of Denbigh (1943–1995), British peer and racing driver
 Robert Rollo Gillespie (1766–1814), British Army major-general
 Rollo Hayman (1925–2008), Rhodesian politician
 Rollo Jack (1902–1994), English footballer
 Rollo Mainguy (1901–1979), Canadian vice-admiral
 Rollo May (1909–1994), American psychologist
 Rollo Pain (1921–2005), British Army lieutenant-general
 Rollo Weeks (born 1987), British actor

Last name 

 Andrew Rollo, 5th Lord Rollo (1703–1765), British army general in Canada and Dominica
 Alex Rollo (1926–2004), Scottish football player and manager
 Bill Rollo (born 1955), British Army officer
 David Rollo (footballer) (1891–1963), Northern Ireland Association Football player
 David Rollo (rugby union) (born 1934), Scottish rugby union footballer
 Hamish Rollo (1955-2009), British Army Officer
 Jim Rollo (1937–2012), Scottish footballer
 Jimmy Rollo (born 1976), English footballer
 John Rollo (dead 1809), Scottish military surgeon
 Marcus Di Rollo (born 1978), Scottish rugby union footballer
 Robert Rollo (1887–1917), Scottish footballer
 Robert Rollo, 4th Lord Rollo (1679–1758), Scottish nobleman and Jacobite; father of Andrew Rollo
 William Rollo (academic) (1894–1960), South African linguist and classicist
 Sir William Rollo (died 1645), Scottish Royalist soldier

Fictional characters
 Rollo, in books by Jacob Abbott
 King Rollo, a children's cartoon character
 Rollo Haveall, the rich little kid in Nancy comic books and the comic strip
 Rollo Lawson, on the American television show Sanford and Son
 Rollo Lee, the lead character in the film Fierce Creatures, played by John Cleese
 Rollo the Hippo, on the American children's television show Captain Kangaroo
 Rollo Tomasi, imaginary character from the 1997 film L.A. Confidential
 Rollo Rhubarb, the teacher's pet and foil to Hans and Fritz in The Katzenjammer Kids comic strip by Harold Knerr
 Rollo Lothbrok, a character in the TV series Vikings
 Rollo Fitzgerald, the antagonist in Ken Follett's 2017 novel A Column of Fire
 Rollo the Clown, from the 1991 film The Little Engine That Could
 Rollo the Clown, from the Adventures of Superman episode titled "The Clown Who Cried"

See also
 Clan Rollo, a Scottish clan

References